Urania Sternwarte is an observatory in Zurich, Switzerland.

Urania Sternwarte may also refer to:

Urania Sternwarte (Vienna), at Vienna, Austria
Urania Sternwarte (Berlin), at Berlin, Germany; see List of largest optical refracting telescopes